Ivo Šušak (born 10 June 1948) is a Croatian football manager. He was the head coach of Dinamo Vinkovci, Zagreb, Osijek, Maribor, and Dinamo Tbilisi. He was also the head coach of Croatia under-21 team and the Georgian national team.

During the 2000–01 Slovenian PrvaLiga season he coached Maribor and won the league with the club, thus becoming the first foreign coach with the title of the Slovenian football champion. He has also won a Georgian championship and cup with Dinamo Tbilisi. He won the CIS Cup in Moscow with Dinamo Tbilisi in 2004.

Honours

Manager
Zagreb
Yugoslav Third League: 1989–90
Yugoslav Second League: 1990–91

Maribor
Slovenian PrvaLiga: 2000–01

Dinamo Tbilisi
Georgian Premier League: 2002–03
Georgian Cup: 2003–04
Commonwealth of Independent States Cup: 2004

References

External links

1948 births
Living people
People from Široki Brijeg
Croats of Bosnia and Herzegovina
Croatian football managers
Yugoslav football managers
HNK Cibalia managers
NK Zagreb managers
Expatriate football managers in Armenia
FC Mika managers
NK Osijek managers
Croatian expatriate football managers
Expatriate football managers in Georgia (country)
FC Dinamo Tbilisi managers
Georgia national football team managers
Expatriate football managers in Slovenia
NK Maribor managers
Croatian Football League managers
Croatian expatriate sportspeople in Slovenia